The Violin Concerto is a composition for solo violin and orchestra by the Scottish composer James MacMillan.  The piece was first performed at the Barbican Centre on May 12, 2010 by the violinist Vadim Repin and the London Symphony Orchestra under the conductor Valery Gergiev.  The work is dedicated to Vadim Repin and in memoriam of the composer's mother, Ellen MacMillan.

Composition
The Violin Concerto has a duration of roughly 25 minutes and is composed in three movements:
Dance
Song
Song and Dance

Instrumentation
The work is scored for solo violin and an orchestra comprising two flutes, two oboes, cor anglais, two clarinets, bassoon, contrabassoon, two horns, two trumpets, two trombones, tuba, timpani, two percussionists, piano, and strings.

Reception
Reviewing the world premiere, David Nice of The Arts Desk lauded, "As soloist Vadim Repin and conductor Valery Gergiev whirled us tumultuously through its hyperactive songs and dances, there was so much I wanted to savour, to hear again. That won't be a problem. So long as there are violinists of Repin's calibre able to play it, the work is here to stay."  He added:
The piece received similar praise in the United States, where Steve Smith of The New York Times wrote, "Mr. MacMillan’s estimable mastery of orchestral timbre and effect is evident throughout."  George Loomis of The Classical Review similarly opined that the concerto "makes for exhilarating and absorbing listening."

See also
List of compositions by James MacMillan

References

Concertos by James MacMillan
2009 compositions
MacMillan